Maiji District is a district of the prefecture-level city of Tianshui in the southeast of Gansu Province, China, bordering Shaanxi Province to the east. It is best known for, and named after, the Maijishan Grottoes. Before 2005 it was called Beidao District.

Maiji District is subdivided in 17 towns (containing 379 villages), 3 subdistricts (containing 35 residential communities). 69% of the population is rural. 68% of the district's area is covered in forest.

Administrative divisions
Maiji District is divided to 3 subdistricts, 17 towns and 6 others.
Subdistricts
 Daobei Subdistrict
 Beidaobu Subdistrict
 Qiaonan Subdistrict

Towns
The towns of Weinan, Zhongtan and Shifo together are also known under the name Sanyuanchuan.

Others
 Tianshui Economic Development Zone
 Tianshui High-tech Industrial Park 
 Tianshui City Agricultural High-tech Demonstration Zone
 Sanyang Industrial Demonstration Zone
 Nianpu Industrial Demonstration Zone
 Dongkehe Industrial Park

Climate

Economy
Huaniu apples are a speciality agricultural product grown in the area. Other produce grown include forest fruits, vegetables and grapes.

Industries include machinery manufacturing, electrical appliance production, IT, medicine, food production, and building materials.

See also
 List of administrative divisions of Gansu

References

Maiji District
Tianshui